Crane Creek is a  long 4th order tributary to the Little River in Moore County, North Carolina.

Variant names
According to the Geographic Names Information System, it has also been known historically as:  
Crains Creek
Little Crains Creek
North Fork Crains Creek

Course
Crane Creek rises on the Crowley Creek divide about 2 miles east of Carthage in Moore County, North Carolina.  Crane Creek then flows southeast to meet the Little River about 1 mile south of Mt. Pleasant.

Watershed
Crane Creek drains  of area, receives about 48.2 in/year of precipitation, has a topographic wetness index of 454.64 and is about 39% forested.

References

Rivers of North Carolina
Rivers of Moore County, North Carolina